Ali Barid Shah I was the third ruler of the Barid Shahi dynasty at Bidar. He succeeded his father in 1540, and ruled until his death in 1580. He was considered a man of letters, and invited scholars and craftsmen from all over the Indian subcontinent to his capital. He is also known to have played a key logistical role in the Battle of Talikota.

Reign 
He was the third ruler of the Barid Shahi dynasty, but the first to assume royal titles. 

During his reign, Bidar was attacked by Murtaza Nizam Shah, who intended to annex it as a jagir for his general Sahib Khan. The Nizam Shahi army was also reinforced by troops from the Golconda Sultanate. Ali Barid sought assistance from Ali Adil Shah I of Bijapur, who sent a thousand horsemen towards the cause. The Nizam Shahi army later returned to their capital in order to quell a rebellion.

Ali Barid was also in attendance at the Battle of Talikota, where the Deccan Sultanates united against the Vijayanagara Empire. He played a key logistical role in the battle.

He ordered the construction of his own tomb, which was completed in 1576. Another building commissioned by him is the Rangin Mahal within the Bidar Fort. Ali Barid died in 1579.

Gallery

See also
Deccan sultanates

References

Notes

Citations

Bibliography
 
Barid Shahi sultans